Caladenia leucochila is a species of orchid endemic to the south-west of Western Australia. It has a single leaf and one or two pale yellow to greenish cream and white flowers with dull red stripes. it is a rare species, only known from near Collie.

Description 
Caladenia leucochila is a terrestrial, perennial, deciduous, herb with an underground tuber and which grows as solitary plants. The sepals and petals are linear to lance-shaped for about half their length then suddenly narrow. The sides of the labellum have long, forward-facing white or red linear teeth decreasing in size towards the front of the labellum. Flowering occurs from September to October.

Taxonomy and naming 
Caladenia leucochila was first described in 2001 by Andrew Brown, Ryan Phillips and Garry Brockman from a specimen collected near Collie and the description was published in Nuytsia. The specific epithet (leucochila) is said to be derived from the Greek leuco- meaning "white" and chilus meaning "-lipped", referring to the white labellum. In ancient Greek, chilus is not attested, while cheilos (χεῖλος) means 'lip'.

Distribution and habitat 
This caladenia is only known from the Collie district in the Jarrah Forest biogeographic region where it grows in sandy soil in open forest and scrub.

Conservation 
Caladenia leucochila is classified as "Threatened Flora (Declared Rare Flora — Extant)" by the Western Australian Government Department of Parks and Wildlife.

References 

leucochila
Orchids of Western Australia
Endemic orchids of Australia
Plants described in 2015
Endemic flora of Western Australia
Taxa named by Andrew Phillip Brown